Mircea Diaconu (born 24 December 1949) is a Romanian actor, writer, and politician. First appearing on stage in 1970, and on screen two years later, Diaconu pursued a lengthy career in both formats, working with a series of prominent directors. He acted in some sixty films through the 2000s, and continued to act in theatre during the ensuing decade. He took part in the Romanian Revolution of 1989. In 2008, he entered electoral politics, becoming a senator, and subsequently serving a term as a Member of the European Parliament. In 2019, he ran for president, placing fourth.

Biography

Acting, writing, Revolution
Born in Vlădești, Argeș County, he graduated high school in Câmpulung in 1967 and Bucharest's I.L. Caragiale Institute of Theatre and Film Arts in 1971. He was obliged to join the Romanian Communist Party during his second year of university, due to the high grades he had achieved. In 1980 he married , herself an actress; the couple have two children.

Diaconu made his theatrical debut a year before finishing university, at the Bulandra Theater, in Truman Capote's The Grass Harp. His screen debut came in Dan Pița's  (1972); he would later appear in the same director's  (1975). In all, he has appeared in more than sixty films.

Liviu Ciulei hired him at Bulandra in 1972, and he remained there for a decade, before moving on to Nottara. At Bulandra, he appeared in Twelfth Night and The Tempest, both under Ciulei's direction; and in Marin Sorescu's Răceala, directed by Dan Micu. At Nottara, he appeared in Alexander Ostrovsky's The Forest; Ultimul bal, after Liviu Rebreanu's Forest of the Hanged; and Mihai Ispirescu's Într-o dimineață. He became the director of Nottara Theater in 2004, working as such until his resignation in 2011.

A participant in the Romanian Revolution, he was rehearsing a play at Nottara when Nicolae Ceaușescu's final speech began on 21 December 1989. During the day, he and his colleagues organized students to go to area factories and urge workers to declare an immediate strike. He spent the night outdoors with students, believing that, although the uprising lacked familiar leaders who could be trusted, the crowd at least recognized popular actors' faces. During the night, Securitate secret police fired through apartment windows, while the next morning, Diaconu saw that agents had quietly killed people with brass knuckles. However, he soon noticed that a revolution was in full swing, the boulevards leading to the city center packed with advancing workers who had trapped two tanks, one of which he rode to the Central Committee building from which Ceaușescu had spoken the previous day. Later, he was among several figures to appear before a microphone in Palace Square. Addressing a throng chanting anti-Ceaușescu slogans, he repeated an appeal for calm. The following year, he was a founding member of the Civic Alliance Foundation.

In 1990 he became the country's first actor to resign his contract with a theater and become a freelancer. Other theaters with which he has appeared include Theatrum Mundi and the National Theatre Bucharest. He taught acting at his alma mater between 1977 and 1978, and again from 1991 to 1998. He wrote three books that appeared under the Communist regime. The first, Șugubina (1977), is a volume of short stories. The second, La noi, când vine iarna, was initially published as a children's book in 1980 and was republished as a novel for adults in 2013. The third, Scaunul de pânză al actorului (1985), includes sketches about the theatrical world. In 2000, then-President Emil Constantinescu awarded him the National Order of Merit, Officer rank.

Politics

Diaconu began his political career in 2008, when he was elected to the Senate for Argeș County as a member of the National Liberal Party (PNL). While there, he served on the culture committee; his term expired at the following election. In May 2012, he was named Culture Minister in the new Victor Ponta cabinet, but was forced out of office the following month when the High Court of Cassation and Justice ruled there was a conflict of interest between his ministerial position and his managerial role at the theater. The same year, he was the subject of an investigation by prosecutors for having helped hire his wife as a director at Nottara Theatre in 2007, despite the fact that she did not meet the necessary qualifications.

In March 2014, when the PNL failed to include him on its list of candidates for that year's European Parliament election, Diaconu decided to run as an independent. Although his candidacy was initially rejected by the electoral authorities because the 2012 court decision had found him ineligible for political office, an appeals court placed him on the ballot, finding that he could in fact run for other offices than the one involved in the older case (that is, Senator). During the campaign, he built up the image of an independent persecuted by bureaucratic institutions determined to keep him out of office, benefiting from favorable media coverage. He won some 380,000 votes or 6.8% of the national total (ahead of two political parties that won seats), assuring him a term as an MEP. As an independent, he was only required to win 3.1% of the vote in order to secure a seat; he obtained double digits in the counties of Constanța (13.3%) and Botoșani (10.4%). He is thought to have significantly eroded the PNL vote, with one party member, Nicolae Robu, claiming Diaconu cut its performance by nearly half. In the 2014–2019 legislature of the European Parliament, he sat with the Alliance of Liberals and Democrats for Europe Group, and was vice president of the Culture Committee.

In August 2019, Diaconu entered the presidential race as an independent. Subsequently, ALDE and PRO Romania formed an electoral alliance in support of Diaconu, called "Un Om" ("one man" or "a human being"). His proposals included expanding the Cernavodă Nuclear Power Plant and salvaging the Rovinari Power Station; building and revitalizing Danube River ports and bridges, using European Union funds; unifying small landholdings into larger, more profitable farms; and a stricter approach to school discipline, such as banning mobile phones and reintroducing uniforms. On foreign policy, he called for Romania to play a stronger role within the EU and NATO, while reaffirming the country's alliance with the United States. His policies were targeted at a rural electorate and recalled those of the 1990s and early 2000s, when Ion Iliescu was president. Diaconu finished in fourth place, with nearly 9% of the vote.

Electoral history

European elections

Presidential elections

Filmography

Books 
 Șugubina (1977), Editura Albatros
 La noi, când vine iarna (1980), Editura Ion Creangă; 2013, Editura Polirom
 Scaunul de pânză al actorului (1985), Editura Meridiane

Notes

References

External links

 
 European Parliament profile

1949 births
Living people
People from Argeș County
20th-century Romanian male actors
Candidates for President of Romania
Caragiale National University of Theatre and Film alumni
Romanian male film actors
Romanian male stage actors
Romanian theatre directors
Romanian male short story writers
Romanian short story writers
Romanian novelists
People of the Romanian Revolution
Members of the Senate of Romania
Romanian Ministers of Culture
National Liberal Party (Romania) politicians
MEPs for Romania 2014–2019
Romanian actor-politicians
Romanian male novelists
Recipients of the National Order of Merit (Romania)